Devarashigihalli is a village in Belgaum district in the southern state of Karnataka, India.Village Directory, 2001 Census of India

References

Villages in Belagavi district